Royoporus badius or Picipes badius, commonly known as the black-footed polypore or black-leg, is a species of fungus in the family Polyporaceae. It causes a white rot of hardwoods and conifers. The species is found in temperate areas of Asia, Australia, Europe, and North America.

Taxonomy 
The species was first described in the scientific literature in 1801 by Christian Hendrik Persoon, who named it Boletus badius. American mycologist Lewis David de Schweinitz transferred the species to Polyporus in 1832, and it was known by this name until 1997, when De transferred the species into the genus Royoporus, which he had described the year before. Polyporaceae species that are closely phylogenetically related to R. badius include  P. dictyopus, P. melanopus, and P. tubaeformis, which have clamp connections on generative hyphae and a similar ecology.  Zmitrovich & Kovalenko proposed the new genus Picipes for this fungus together with P. melanopus and P. tubaeformis and according to Species Fungorum Picipes badius is now the correct current name. 

The specific epithet badius derives from the Latin root badi-, meaning "reddish brown". The common names "black-footed polypore" and "black-leg" refer to its characteristic dark-colored stipe.

Description 

The fruit bodies of Royoporus badius tend to be upright, growing solitary or in groups, sometimes with two or more fruit bodies arising from a common stipe. The cap is circular or kidney-shaped, and often lobed or with a wavy edge.

The upper cap surface is smooth and glossy, but develops radial wrinkles as it ages. The color of the cap is brown, often darker in the center and lighter-colored at the margins. The under-surface is white or cream-colored, yellowing when old. Pores are round and number 6–8 per mm, with decurrent tubes (running down the length of the stipe). The fruit bodies are inedible because of their tough texture.

The spores are ellipsoid or cylindrical, hyaline (translucent), smooth, and 7.5–9 by 3–5 µm. The basidia (spore-bearing cells) are club-shaped with a narrow base, and have dimensions of 20–30 by 7–9 µm. Like other members of the genus Polyporus, this species has a dimitic hyphal construction, meaning that the hyphae are made of both generative hyphae and skeleto-ligative hyphae, a feature which tends to make the mushroom tissue hard and woody. There are no cystidia in the hymenium. The fungus has been shown to produce asexual spores when grown in pure culture conditions.

Habitat and distribution 
Royoporus badius is a saprobic species, and causes white rot. It grows on the standing or fallen trunks and branches of various hardwood genera, including Acer, Aesculus, Alnus, Betula, Castanea, Fagus, Fraxinus, Populus, Prunus, Robinia, Quercus, Salix, Tilia and Ulmus. The fungus grows in temperate regions of Asia, Europe, and North America.

References 

Polyporaceae
Fungi of Asia
Fungi of Australia
Fungi of Europe
Fungi of North America
Fungi described in 1783
Inedible fungi
Taxa named by Christiaan Hendrik Persoon